4868 Knushevia, provisional designation  is a bright Hungaria asteroid and suspected binary system from the innermost regions of the asteroid belt, approximately 2 kilometers in diameter. It was discovered on 27 October 1989, by American astronomer Eleanor Helin at the Palomar Observatory in California, United States. The asteroid was named for the Kyiv University in Ukraine.

Classification and orbit 

Knushevia is a bright member of the Hungaria family, which forms the innermost dense concentration of asteroids in the Solar System. It orbits the Sun in the inner main-belt at a distance of 1.8–2.1 AU once every 2 years and 9 months (1,003 days). Its orbit has an eccentricity of 0.07 and an inclination of 22° with respect to the ecliptic.

Physical characteristics

Lightcurves and satellite 

Between 2008 and 2011, three rotational lightcurves of Knushevia were obtained from photometric observations by American astronomer Brian Warner. Lightcurve analysis gave a rotation period between 4.45 and 4.717 hours with an exceptionally low brightness amplitude of 0.01 magnitude.

In May 2015, Warner measured a period of 3.1422 hours with an amplitude of 0.09. The photometric observation also revealed that Knushevia might be a binary asteroid with a minor-planet moon orbiting it every 11.922 hours. The results, however, are tentative only.

Diameter and albedo 

According to the survey carried out by NASA's Wide-field Infrared Survey Explorer with its subsequent NEOWISE mission, Knushevia measures 1.535 kilometers in diameter and its surface has an outstandingly high albedo of 1.000.

The Collaborative Asteroid Lightcurve Link assumes an albedo for bright E-type asteroids of 0.40 – derived from 434 Hungaria, the family's largest member and namesake – and calculates a diameter of 2.30 kilometers based on an absolute magnitude of 14.8.

Naming 

This minor planet (translit.: Knushevia) was named after Kyiv University (full name , translit.: Кyivs'kyj Natsional'nyj Universytet іmeni (name) Shevchenka) for its great achievement in the education, science and culture of Ukraine. It is one of the oldest and most prestigious universities in Ukraine. The approved naming citation was published by the Minor Planet Center on 27 April 2002.

References

External links 
 Lightcurve plot of 4868 Knushevia, Palmer Divide Observatory, B. D. Warner (2011)
 Asteroid Lightcurve Database (LCDB), query form (info )
 Dictionary of Minor Planet Names, Google books
 Asteroids and comets rotation curves, CdR – Observatoire de Genève, Raoul Behrend
 Discovery Circumstances: Numbered Minor Planets (1)-(5000) – Minor Planet Center
 
 

004868
Discoveries by Eleanor F. Helin
Named minor planets
004868
19891027